The name Urduja was used for three tropical cyclones in the Philippines by PAGASA in the Western Pacific. The name was derived from a legendary warrior princess.

 Tropical Depression 27W (2009) (T0927, 27W, Urduja) – short-lived cyclone, developed east of Mindanao
 Typhoon Francisco (2013) (T1326, 26W, Urduja) – Category 5 super typhoon, passed southeast of Okinawa and mainland Japan
 Tropical Storm Kai-tak (2017) (T1732, 32W, Urduja) – traversed the Visayas region of the Philippines, causing more than ₱1 billion worth of damage

The name Urduja was retired from use in the Philippine area of responsibility following the 2017 typhoon season and replaced with Uwan on the rotating four-year list of storm names.

Pacific typhoon set index articles